A dakimakura (from daki  "embrace" and makura  "pillow") is a type of large pillow from Japan which are usually coupled with pillow covers depicting anime characters. The word is often translated to English as body pillow or waifu pillow. In Japan, dakimakura are similar to Western orthopedic body pillows, and are commonly used by Japanese youth as "comfort objects".

History

During the late '90s and early 2000s, dakimakura began to intertwine with otaku culture, leading to the production of pillow covers featuring printed images of bishōjo and bishōnen posed lying down from various anime or bishōjo games. Many of these early otaku dakimakura covers were released through Cospa, a character goods and apparel store which as of 2018 continues to release official dakimakura covers.

Although dakimakura are sometimes called "Dutch wife", the original definition of this phrase is closer to the chikufujin, or "bamboo wife".

The year 2015 saw some of the first talking body pillows with Ita-Supo and its mascot, Rina Makuraba. It was invented by former Kyushu Institute of Technology researcher, Koichi Uchimura.

Sizes
Dakimakura are available in two main sizes,  in length with a  width ( circumference).

Prior to the mid-2000s, dakimakura were available in one size; . Since the late 2000s,  dakimakura became available and increasingly popular due to shipping cost savings from being under the  airmail weight limit.

Due to the increase in popularity, new sizes have been created to adapt to all heights and ages, and although there are other sizes available, the 5 most popular sizes are: 180x60, 170x60, 160x60, 150x50 and 140x40 cm.

Love pillows 
Love pillows are a subset of dakimakura usually portraying life-size pictures of characters in suggestive poses. They may portray anime characters, furry characters, or pornographic film actors.

See also 
Co-sleeping
Sex doll
Bolster
Bamboo wife

References

External links

 

Japanese inventions
Otaku
Pillows